The Osaka Prefecture University Satellite, or OPUSAT was a technology demonstration cubesat built and operated by Japan's Osaka Prefecture University. It had a size of 100x100x100mm (without antennas and solar paddles) and build around a standard 1U cubesat bus. The primary satellite purpose was the space testing of the power system based on a Lithium-ion capacitor. The tests were largely successful, and it finished operation by reentry to Earth atmosphere on 24 July 2014. The OPUSAT was a development successor to “Maido Ichigo” satellite by East Osaka Craftmen Astro-Technology SOHLA in Osaka.

See also

List of CubeSats
OPUSAT-II

References

External links
 Official Homepage
 OPUSAT Packet Decoder 
 Gunters space OPUSAT page
 Description and block diagram of OPUSAT

Spacecraft launched in 2014
Spacecraft which reentered in 2014
2014 in Japan
Satellites of Japan